Cytochrome P450, family 13, also known as CYP13, is a nematoda cytochrome P450 monooxygenase family. The first gene identified in this family is the CYP13A1 from the Caenorhabditis elegans.

CYP13 can be divided into subfamily CYP13A and CYP13B, and the CYP13B was named CYP16 family at the beginning of its discovery, which have been discontinued and been changed to the current name, because its genetic relationship with the subfamily CYP13A.

Genes in C. elegans

References 

Animal genes
13
Protein families